The 2018 Players Championship (officially the 2018 Ladbrokes Players Championship) was a professional ranking snooker tournament that took place from 19 to 25 March 2018 in Llandudno, Wales. It was the eighteenth ranking event of the 2017/2018 season.

Judd Trump was the defending champion, but he was beaten by Ronnie O'Sullivan 6–5 in the semi-finals.

Ronnie O'Sullivan captured his 33rd ranking title and fifth ranking title of the season by defeating Shaun Murphy 10–4 in the final, equalling the record of most ranking titles in a season shared by Stephen Hendry, Ding Junhui and Mark Selby.

Prize fund
The breakdown of prize money for this year is shown below:

 Winner: £125,000
 Runner-up: £50,000
 Semi-final: £30,000
 Quarter-final: £15,000
 Last 16: £10,000

 Highest break: £5,000
 Total: £380,000

The "rolling 147 prize" for a maximum break stood at £30,000

Seeding list
The seedings were conducted on the basis of the one-year ranking list up to and including the 2018 Gibraltar Open.

Main draw

Final

Century breaks
Total: 28

 143, 134, 121, 106, 100  Ronnie O'Sullivan
 141, 127, 124  Mark Williams
 137, 133, 133, 117, 115, 105  Shaun Murphy
 133, 107  Ryan Day
 130  Luca Brecel
 129, 102  Stephen Maguire
 128, 123, 117, 109, 100  Judd Trump
 119  Ding Junhui
 107, 103  Neil Robertson
 107  Anthony McGill

References

2018
Players Championship
Players Championship
Snooker competitions in Wales
Llandudno
Players Championship